The 1986 NCAA Division I Wrestling Championships were the 56th NCAA Division I Wrestling Championships to be held. The University of Iowa in Iowa City, Iowa hosted the tournament at Carver–Hawkeye Arena.

Iowa took home the team championship with 158 points and having five individual champions.

Marty Kistler of Iowa was named the Most Outstanding Wrestler and Gary Albright of Nebraska received the Gorriaran Award.

Team results

Individual finals

References

NCAA Division I Wrestling Championship
NCAA
Wrestling competitions in the United States
NCAA Division I  Wrestling Championships
NCAA Division I  Wrestling Championships
NCAA Division I  Wrestling Championships